Alex Pardee is an American freelance artist, apparel designer, and comics creator writer, best known for illustrating the Used's album artwork.

Career
He has also done works for Hurley International, Twenty Twenty Skateboards, Bay Area rapper TopR, Upper Playground, Street Drum Corps, Aiden, Kid Robot, and lately the cover of In Flames's ninth studio album, A Sense of Purpose, and its first single, "The Mirror's Truth". He is a member of the groups Cardboard City and Zerofriends. He runs the website EyeSuck Ink which includes links to his blog and store. Through his art he has admitted to overcoming depression and anxiety disorders along with emotional struggles. He uses pens, ink, watercolors, and dye, and is trying to use more acrylics, oils, and latex. Pardee is currently working on a motion picture for Chadam (often confused with Chadam Mihlberger) as well as various art shows and products. Pardee released his first official art book, titled Awful Homesick in October 2008.

He designed the artwork for  Zack Snyder's movie Sucker Punch. 2014 worked as Art Director, Executive Producer and Creature Designer for Adam Green's Biography creature films Digging Up The Marrow.

In 2015 Pardee collaborated on "I Got Your Back" with hip hop artist Justin Bua who described Pardee as "a prolific artist whose imagination is populated with wicked, warped, and wacky characters that walk a tightrope between playful and grotesque. His artistic world inspires all artists to not only strive for greatness, but more importantly, to have fun."

Published works

Albums, singles and musical releases
 Aesop Rock
 The Impossible Kid
 Aiden
 Conviction
 In Flames
 "The Mirror's Truth"
 A Sense of Purpose
 Street Drum Corps
 Street Drum Corps
 We Are Machines
 TopR
 Cheap laughs for dead comedians
 Marathon of shame
 The Used
 "Take It Away"
 In Love and Death
 "All That I've Got"
 "I Caught Fire"
 Berth
 "The Bird and the Worm"
 "Liar Liar (Burn in Hell)"
 Lies for the Liars
 "Pretty Handsome Awkward"
 Shallow Believer
 Cage Kennylz
 Hell's Winter (Tour DVD)
 I Never Knew You EP
 Depart from Me

Music videos
All That I've Got
LiveLavaLive (Mitchell Davis)
WWE Theme Song
Dredg - The Thought of Losing You (producer)

Comics
And So He Bathed in the Blood of the Lepers
Bunnywith
My Book of Poetry
My Book of Feelings
The Ugliest Fairy (2006)
Good Night Lava (2007 Upper Playground limited edition)
Awful Homesick (2008)
Into the Marrow (2009 1988 Gallery Limited edition)
The Secrets of Hollywood (2004)

Calendars
Astrology Is Dead (2002)
The Beautiful People Calendar (2003)
Snoring Blood Calendar (2004)

Web series
Chadam (2010)

References

External links

 Official MySpace
 Zerofriends official webstore
 Eye Suck Ink official website
 Gallery
 Pardee's review of Friday the 13th (2009 film)
 Alex Pardee on Deviantart
 Alex Pardee featured in WWA gallery Show "Shade's of Ray" Color Ink Book 3rd Anniversary Show

American comics artists
1976 births
Living people